Heppendorf is a village in the district of Rhein-Erft-Kreis, in North Rhine-Westphalia, Germany. It is part of the municipality Elsdorf.

Location
Heppendorf is bordered to the east by Sindorf, Geilrath to the south, Stammeln to the west and Widdendorf in the north-west. It is located about 30 km to the west of Cologne.

References

Villages in North Rhine-Westphalia